This is a list of yearly Big East Conference (1979–2013) football standings.  The conference first began football play in 1991.

Big East standings

References

Big East Conference (1979-2013)
Standings